A wreath worn for purpose of attire (in English, a "chaplet";), is a headdress made of leaves, grasses, flowers or branches.  It is typically worn in festive occasions and on holy days and has a long history and association with ancient pageants and ceremonies. Outside occasional use, the wreath can also be used as a crown, or a mark of honour. The wreath most often has an annular geometric construction.

Ancient Greece

The wreath is associated with Greek attire and celebrations since ancient times, continuing a tradition to the modern day Olympic ceremonies. Ancient coinage minted by early Greek city-states often depicted a divinity or other figure with a wreath. Wearing a wreath may have also had a mediating role by helping the wearer get closer to a specific deity. Different plants were dedicated to various gods: oak to Zeus, laurel to Apollo, herbs to Demeter, grapevine to Dionysos and myrtle to Aphrodite. Wreaths were also used to decorate the hermae, stone pillars surmounted with the head of a god or distinguished mortal.

Ancient Rome 

Wreaths were also part of clothing in Ancient Rome.

Laurel wreaths from the bay laurel tree Laurus nobilis were worn by triumphatores – victorious generals celebrating a Roman triumph. Generals awarded a celebration ritual, the ovation wore wreaths of myrtle (Myrtus communis).

Wreaths were awarded as military awards and decorations. In the Roman Republic, the nature of the feat determined the nature of the wreath awarded. It was a custom for soldiers rescued from a siege to present a wreath made of grass ( or ) to the commander of the relieving force. This award was extremely rare, and Pliny the Elder enumerated only eight times occasions that had warranted the honour, ending with the emperor Augustus. The oak leaf civic crown was awarded to Romans who had saved the life of another citizen in battle. The award was open to soldiers in the Roman army of all ranks, unlike most other wreaths, which were awarded to commanders and officers only in the Roman imperial period of the Roman Empire.

A gold wreath was also awarded for gallant military conduct. In the Roman navy, the naval crown (or ) was a wreath awarded for feats in naval battles. In an assault on a fortified position, a mural crown was awarded to the first man onto the walls of the enemy fortification.

Christianity
In Christianity, the wreath represents the resurrection of Christ and therefore eternal life, more appropriately the victory of life over death. The crown of thorns was placed on the Head of Jesus at His execution by crucifixion and became a symbol of the Passion.

Ukraine

A tradition of the Ukrainian wreath, a headdress made of leaves, flowers and branches worn by girls and young unmarried women, dates back to the old Slavic customs that predate the Christianization of Rus. The flower wreath remains a part of the Ukrainian national costume and is worn on festive occasions and on holy days.

Polynesia
Floral wreaths and garlands known as lei (Hawaii) are ubiquitous in Polynesia as both ornamental attire and gifts representative of affection or respect. Worn by men and women around the neck or around the head and commonly fashioned of flowers, leaves, vines and plant fiber.

Indigenous peoples of the Americas
Wreaths are part of the culture and legends of indigenous peoples of the Americas. The Cheyenne people wore wreaths during sacred ceremonies, rituals, dances and songs and head wreaths were usually made from willow, cottonwood or sage.

Modern times
Wreaths have resurged in popularity in the 21st century.  Flower crowns, or "crowns of love", are popular at outdoor music festivals such as Coachella.  Variants made with artificial flowers can be purchased.

Gallery

See also
Diadem
Garland
Tainia

Notes

References
 Thomas Arnold (1871) History of Rome
 Orysia Paszczak Tracz, Vinok, vinochok, The Ukrainian Weekly, August 1, 1999

External links

Crowns and Laurels: Coronae Romanae
Roman Crowns and Wreaths - Roman Colosseum

Headgear

pl:Wianek